The Mercury Commuter is a full-size station wagon that was produced by Mercury from 1957 until 1968. When introduced for the 1957 model year it was priced below Mercury's other two new full size wagons as a part of the Mercury Monterey series, alongside the mid-range Voyager and the top-level Colony Park. In 1957 the same  Lincoln Y-Block V8 that was standard equipment on the Mercury Turnpike Cruiser was optional equipment on the Commuter. From 1957 until 1960 all Mercury station wagons were hardtops, and also offered a rear window that retracted into the tailgate that was not offered on Ford branded station wagons.

The Commuter was initially available as a two-door wagon and as a four-door wagon, and in 1959 all Mercury station wagons were combined into the "Country Cruiser" series. It was temporarily absent in 1963, in concession to the new, smaller intermediate Meteor station wagons, but the full-sized platform was reinstated for 1964, when the Meteor was discontinued. The Commuter was phased out for good, like the full-size Mercury Montclair and Park Lane, after the 1968 model year when the Colony Park became the only Mercury station wagon until 1991.

Commuters in miniature
A 1:72 scale model  of a 1968 Mercury Commuter was added to the Matchbox Series range in 1968 as No. 73. A larger 1:50 scale model of a 1968 Commuter was introduced into the Matchbox King Size range in the following year as No. K-23.

References

 Standard Catalogue of American Cars, 1946–1975 (Revised 4th Edition)

1950s cars
1960s cars
Commuter
Station wagons